Admiral Sir Herbert Sawyer KCB (fl. 1783–1833) was an officer of the Royal Navy who saw service during the American Revolution, the French Revolutionary War, the War of 1812 and the Napoleonic Wars.  He eventually rose to the rank of Admiral.

Family and early life

Sawyer was born the eldest son of Admiral Herbert Sawyer and followed his father into the navy. He saw service during the American Revolution, serving with his father who (by this time) was a captain and commanded a number of ships during the war. By the end of the war, the younger Sawyer was in command of the sloop . He was promoted to Post-Captain in 1789 and took command of the 28-gun frigate .  He served aboard her on the North American Station, operating off Newfoundland.  His father was the commander of the base at Halifax during this time.

Service in the wars

He sailed with Nassau as part of the North Sea Fleet until 1797 when he took command of the 74-gun . By 1799, he was commander of  where he remained until the spring of 1801. He then moved aboard  and sailed to the West Indies with Sir Robert Calder's fleet. On Sawyer's return to Britain, he was put in charge of the payment of ships based at Plymouth, a job he held until he was promoted to rear-admiral on 2 October 1807. By early 1810, he was made second-in-command of Portsmouth dockyard and, by the end of the year, was again promoted; this time to the rank of vice-admiral. In 1810 he was appointed to the post of commander-in-chief of the North American Station – his father's old command – which he held during the War of 1812 before relinquishing it in 1813. He then became commander-in-chief of the Cork Station. He became a Knight Commander of the Order of the Bath on 2 January 1815 and was promoted to Admiral of the White in 1825. He died in Bath, Somerset in 1833.

Notes

References

  — mention of his son this Herbert Sawyer

Further reading

|-

1833 deaths
Royal Navy admirals
Royal Navy personnel of the American Revolutionary War
Royal Navy personnel of the French Revolutionary Wars
Royal Navy personnel of the War of 1812
Royal Navy personnel of the Napoleonic Wars
Knights Commander of the Order of the Bath
1780s births